Wicklow County Council is the authority responsible for local government in County Wicklow, Ireland. As a county council, it is governed by the Local Government Act 2001. The council is responsible for housing and community, roads and transportation, urban planning and development, amenity and culture, and environment. The council has 32 elected members. Elections are held every five years and are by single transferable vote. The head of the council has the title of Cathaoirleach (Chairperson). The county administration is headed by Chief Executive, Brian Gleeson. The county town is Wicklow.

History
Originally Wicklow County Council held its meetings in Wicklow Courthouse. The county council moved to a new facility, known as County Buildings, in 1977.

Local Electoral Areas and Municipal Districts
Wicklow County Council is divided into local electoral areas, defined by electoral divisions, and into municipal districts which exercise powers of the council locally.

Councillors
The following were elected at the 2019 Wicklow County Council election.

2019 seats summary

Councillors by electoral area
This list reflects the order in which councillors were elected on 24 May 2019.

Notes

Co-options

References

External links

Politics of County Wicklow
County councils in the Republic of Ireland